Joan Esteva Pomares (born 28 April 1973) is a former Spanish footballer and currently a football coach. He is currently the head coach of Hong Kong Premier League club Resources Capital.

Club career
As a player, Esteva played for the youth teams of PB Anguera, Europa and Espanyol, before spending two seasons with third-tier L'Hospitalet. He also played for Cerdanyola Mataró and Sant Andreu.

Managerial career
Esteva became player-manager of CF Alella, before taking up a similar position at Sant Cugat. He went on to manage Sporting Mahonés, Constància and Castellón, before joining Ferreries in June 2015. After a short spell, he joined his former club Sant Andreu in October of the same year.

In August 2019, Esteva became the head coach of Hong Kong Premier League club Resources Capital. On 3 June 2022, it was announced that Esteva had left the club after 3 years.

On 19 September 2022, Esteva was appointed as the Director of Football for Philippines Football League club United City.

On 4 November 2022, Esteva returned to Resources Capital as the head coach of the club once again.

Career statistics

Club

Notes

Managerial statistics

References

External links

1973 births
Living people
Footballers from Barcelona
Spanish footballers
Spanish football managers
Association football midfielders
Segunda División B players
CE Europa footballers
RCD Espanyol footballers
UE Sant Andreu footballers
CE L'Hospitalet players
CE Constància managers
CD Castellón managers
UE Sant Andreu managers
CE Europa managers
UE Figueres managers
Spanish expatriate sportspeople in Hong Kong
Expatriate football managers in Hong Kong